is a former Japanese football player. She played for Japan national team.

National team career
Shimizu was born on March 9, 1960. In June 1981, she was selected Japan national team for 1981 AFC Championship. At this competition, on June 7, she debuted against Chinese Taipei. This match is Japan team first match in International A Match. She played in 2 matches at this championship. She played 3 games for Japan include this competition in 1981.

National team statistics

References

1960 births
Living people
Japanese women's footballers
Japan women's international footballers
Tasaki Perule FC players
Women's association footballers not categorized by position